Torsten Gustav Adolf Lindberg (14 April 1917 – 31 August 2009) was a Swedish football player and manager. As a player, he won a gold medal at the 1948 Summer Olympics and a bronze medal at the 1950 FIFA World Cup; as a manager he won two league titles with Djurgårdens IF in 1964 and 1966.

Lindberg played club football with Husqvarna IF, IK Tord, Örgryte IS and IFK Norrköping. As a manager, he coached IFK Norrköping, Djurgårdens IF and AIK; he was also Assistant Coach of the Swedish national side during the 1958 FIFA World Cup.

References

External links

1917 births
2009 deaths
Swedish footballers
Sweden international footballers
Olympic footballers of Sweden
Olympic gold medalists for Sweden
Footballers at the 1948 Summer Olympics
1950 FIFA World Cup players
IFK Norrköping players
Örgryte IS players
Swedish football managers
IFK Norrköping managers
AIK Fotboll managers
Djurgårdens IF Fotboll managers
Olympic medalists in football
Association football goalkeepers
Medalists at the 1948 Summer Olympics
People from Nässjö Municipality
Sportspeople from Jönköping County